Sacri Cuori di Gesù e Maria a Tor Fiorenza is a 20th parochial church and titular church in Rome, dedicated to the Sacred Heart of Jesus and Immaculate Heart of Mary.

Parish church 

The church was built in 1954–57.

On 14 February 2015, it was made a titular church to be held by a cardinal-priest. 
List
 Edoardo Menichelli (2015–present)

References

External links

Titular churches
Rome Q. XVII Trieste
Roman Catholic churches completed in 1957
20th-century Roman Catholic church buildings in Italy